Russ Marin (May 1, 1934 – March 6, 2005) was an American film and television actor active from the early 1970s to the early 1990s.

Career
Among the many shows he guest starred include Mannix, Bonanza, The Secrets of Isis, Wonder Woman, The Waltons, Night Court, Falcon Crest, and Murder She Wrote. His many film appearances included Kansas City Bomber, the blaxploitation flick Slaughter's Big Rip-Off starring Jim Brown, Capone, The Feather and Father Gang, Body Double and Mommie Dearest.
Cheers... 2nd-season episode" no help wanted". He also appeared in the Battlestar Galactica episode 22, "Experiment in Terra" (1979).

Selected filmography

External links
 

1934 births
2005 deaths
American male film actors
American male television actors
Male actors from Massachusetts
20th-century American male actors